José Luis Mata Santacruz (born March 19, 1966, in Guadalajara, Jalisco) is a Mexican football manager and former player.

External links
Liga MX 

1966 births
Living people
Mexican footballers
Footballers from Guadalajara, Jalisco
Mexican football managers
Association footballers not categorized by position
Atlas F.C. managers